Honnavara Taluk is one of the five coastal taluks in the district of Uttara Kannada in Karnataka, India.

Geography 
Honnavara taluk has Arabian Sea to the west, Kumta Taluk to the North, Siddapur and Sagar taluks to the east and Bhatkal taluk to the south. The western part of the taluk towards Arabian sea is a plain with Paddy fields, Coconut and Areca plantation while the eastern part has Sahyadri hill range.

Demographics

As of the Census of 2011, there were 160,331 people, 32,808 households in Honavar Taluk, of which Males constitute 49.9% (80,018) and Females were 50.09% (80,313). A majority of the population (141,222) lives in rural villages while about 19,109 people live in semi-urban Honavar town, which is the headquarters of the taluk.

Most people in Honavar taluk are native speakers of Kannada language. There are sizeable numbers of people who speak other languages such as Konkani and Nawayath. This can be attributed to the fact that Honavar taluk, along with the rest of Uttara Kannada district was under Bombay Presidency till India got independence from the British in 1947. Also, it was part of different kingdoms at different times in the history.

Places of interest

 Idagunji is an important place of worship in Uttara Kannada district. Idagunji has an ancient temple to Lord Ganesha constructed by Narada.
 Karikaanamma is a temple to Goddess Kali in Honavar taluk. The temple is on the Western Ghats.
Apsarkonda is a waterfall in the midst of hillocks near Honavar.
 Sharavati river is one of the main attractions of Honavar. The river joins the Arabian Sea at Honnavar. While joining the sea, the river has created some islands.
 Chaturmukha Basadi is a 16th century symmetrical Jain temples located in Gerusoppa village constructed during the reign of Chennabhairadevi, considered the longest reigning India queen.
 Colonel Hill Pillar is a place of interest in Honavar. It is a 30-meter tall column on the top of a hillock by the side of N-H 17. This column was installed in memory of Colonel Hill on 20 January 1845. It was set up by the 14th Madras Native Infantry at the instance of the East India Company in honour of Col. Hill who died at Gersoppa while commanding the Mysore Division.
 Ramtirth is another beautiful location in Honnavar. It is on the Honavar-Chandavar road about 3 km away. This pushkarini or water tank which is 50 steps below the ground level is very spacious. The water from a height falls into the tank from two points called Ramathirtha and Laxmanthirtha. According to local traditions, Sri Rama, Sita and Laxman had a holy dip in the tank during their exile.
 Kasarkod beach is a tourist attraction of Honnavar. It is about 2 km from Honnavar, it is about 5 km long and attracts thousands of tourists every day. It is one of the 12 beaches in India which are shortlisted by Environmental Ministry for the prestigious Blue Flag certification.
 Keppa Jog is a smaller version of Jog Falls. It is situated deep in the hearts of Gerusoppa, which is a hilly village in Honnavar Taluk.
 Basavaraja Durga is a fortified spot is a 19 hectare island in the Arabian Sea. It is 3 km from the Sharavathi Sea Mouth and can be reached by boat. The fort was constructed during the Vijayanagara rule. In 1690, the Keladi ruler Shivappa Nayak captured it and named it Basavarajadurga in memory of the Keladi Prince Basavaraja.

Economy and industry
Agriculture and Fishery are the major contributors to the economy of Honavar taluk. There are also a few Roof tile factories in the taluk that are on decline. Cashew nut processing, Beekeeping and Coir processing are the other businesses in the taluk.

Towns and villages
Honavar taluk consists of the following villages and towns.

References

External links
 Honavar Foundation

Taluks of Karnataka
Geography of Uttara Kannada district